Pentecostal Lam Hon Kwong School (PLHKS) is a Christian school founded in 1983 by the wife of Mr. Lam Hon-kwong. It is a Hong Kong secondary school which adopts English as its medium of instruction (EMI). The school is best known for its drama education. Located next to Yue Tin Court, PLHKS is established by the Kowloon Pentecostal Church.

Class structure (Pre-2010) 
PLHKS provides courses in six levels, as seen in many other secondary schools in Hong Kong. They start from the lowest level, Secondary 1 (S.1) to Secondary 6 (S.6).

There are 4 classes in junior secondary, S.1, S.2 & S.3, while class A in all 3 levels Ii considered to be 'elite' class.

Students are given chances to select their academic options in the second half of their third year. They can mainly either go into the Science route (Physics, Chemistry & Biology) or the Arts route (History, Geography, etc.).

School Song 
Oh, let yonder hills of Shatin resound,

With joy, the song to Thee our hearts are bound,

Lively and young, the Truth we found.

Friends loving, caring and sharing.

Pentecost, we learn the Way.

Pentecost, we live each day.

One Faith, one Hope, one Love;

O Lord, bless our school today.

School Facilities
PLHKS provides wireless internet connection (WiFi) for academic staff. Current students can gain access to the internet by using one of the on-site workstations in the premises. A lift can be accessed by physically-challenged students, staff and visitors. It is located at the end of each corridor next to the rear staircase.

A copier is set up in the library which can be used as scanner as well. The school charges HKD$0.3 (as of 2010) for each A4 black-and-white document copied/printed while HKD$3.0 (as of 2010) for each A4 colour document copied/printed. The scanned documents can be collected in the network folder in the intranet.

Each student and staff are given an identification card (student card/ staff card) which has a contactless technology. The card is used as morning (and sometimes afternoon) attendance taking and is used to activate the library copier. The issue desk in the library scanned the traditional barcode on the card for book clearance. The card is free of charge at its first issuance. Subsequent issuance of the card is charged at at least HKD$35 with a progressive penalty applied which varies every school year.

G/F: Reception; Staff toilets; School Office; Students' Changing Rooms; Student Union (SU) Room; Prefects' Room; Refectory; Covered Playground; Christian Fellowship's Room

1/F: 3 Staff Rooms (Room 101 - 103); Classroom 104 - 106; Music Room; Performing Arts Room

2/F: Classroom 201 - 206; Staff Room 5; Teaching Assistants' Room (the TA room); Home Economics Room; Self-Access Learning Centre (the SAC)

3/F: Classroom 301 - 306; Geography Room; the Library

4/F: Classroom 401 - 406; Staff Room 4; Physics Laboratory

5/F: Classroom 501 - 505; A fish tank; Chemistry Laboratory; Integrated Science (IS) Laboratory

R (the Roof): Multi-functional area (not accessible by the lift and is out of students' bound)

General school rules
New students are to receive basic information including the school rules in their first week in PLHKS. The discipline department mistress speaks to all new secondary one students in an induction programme about the rules they have to obey throughout their life as a student in the school. Some rules include that:
 The roof is out of bound.
 Plagiarism of homework is not allowed and is to be dealt with very seriously.
 No food or drink except water is allowed in classrooms.
 All boys and girls must keep themselves neat at all time.
 One must not enter the toilet for the opposite sex.
 The staff office is out of bound for students except by invitation.
 Hair is not to be dyed.
 PE uniforms are to be worn only for PE lessons.
 Teachers are to be respected at all time.

Some rules are not written in the student handbook but penalties may be exercised by teachers from time to time in case of violation. These include that:
 Using the disabled toilet without seeking prior authorisation.
 Using the lift during school time.

Award and punishment
Students can be awarded or punished by the school for their behavior within the school and outside the school.

Award
Students are to be awarded usually because they served themselves as class monitor, subject leader or other means of servicing. Students are also awarded for prizes gained in inter-school competitions.

Award system
The award systems are classified into several categories.

The minimum honour [Praise > Mini Merit > Minor Merit > Major Merit] The maximum honour

Hidden awards
A merit will be given to students who discovered possessions of which does not belong to them and hand them out. The level of award given depends on the value of the item found.

Punishment
On the other hand, punishments are to be given to students who break the school rules deliberately. Usually students are given demerits for their frequent lateness and frequent failure to produce work on time.

Punishment system
The punishment systems are classified into several categories. The items below has been ranked in severity.

The minimum punishment [Warning < Mini Demerit < Minor Demerit < Major Demerit] The maximum punishment

Detention system

Students who fail to hand in homework are sent to detention. They are expected to complete the work which they missed during their detention.

School administration
There are several departments managing the school. Department members are current teaching staff who also perform teaching duties.

The General Office
The office opens six days a week to deal with general school affairs.

Department of Studies
Chaired by the deputy headmaster, the department endorses teaching plans across all curriculum proposed by various panels.

Department of Discipline
Chaired by the discipline teacher with a few teachers on hold. Their objective is to teach students about their in-school behavior.

Department of Career

Student Union Advisory

Department of Religion

Awards
Established for 35 years, PLHKS has attained several awards which prove the school has improved a lot over years and the effort the staff has paid is recognised by the public.

The Chief Executive's Award for Teaching Excellence

Notable alumni
 Mr Lam Chi Chung - Hong Kong film actor and director
 Miss Priscilla Wong - Hong Kong news anchor and actress
 Miss Fiona Fung - Cantopop singer-lyricist based in Hong Kong
 Miss Kennie Chan - TVB News anchor
 The Hon. Capt. Jeremy Tam - Cathay Pacific Airways pilot and member of the Hong Kong Legislative Council (2016 - )
 Miss Daisy Law - Actress at the ViuTV, Champion of the TVB Magazine Cover Girl in 2011 and champion of the ViuTV The Queen of D.n.A in 2016
 Miss Hailey Chan - Actress at the ViuTV
 Mr Hui Lok Fai Felix - Football anchor at the Cable TV Hong Kong

References

External links

https://www.plhks.edu.hk
https://www.plhks.edu.hk/tc

Protestant secondary schools in Hong Kong
1983 establishments in Hong Kong